Nowhereland or Nowhere Land may refer to:
Nowhere Land (album), 2018 album by Olivia Olson
NowhereLand, working title of the 2009 Eddie Murphy film Imagine That
Nowhere Land, 1998 film starring Dina Meyer	
Nowhereland aka Girl Lost, 2018 film directed by Robin Bain
Nowhere Land, the imaginary world of the Canadian animated children's television series Maggie and the Ferocious Beast

See also
Neverland (disambiguation)